Wat Phrammani, also known as Wat Luang Phor Pak Daeng, is a Buddhist temple (wat) in Nakhon Nayok Province, Thailand. The temple was built during the reign of King Rama I of Thailand.

In Wat Phrammani many buildings serve different functions such as u bo sod, sala rai, pra pho tard phi marn and hor ra kung.

In the old period the temple used brick and mortar or steel to make the building stronger.

References 

Buddhist temples in Nakhon Nayok Province